Kanley Track is a track and field complex located in Kalamazoo, Michigan.  It is the outdoor home of the Western Michigan University track and field varsity squad and university clubs.  At one time, Kanley Track had been a part of Waldo Stadium, before moving across the street to its current location.  The area features a 400-meter Olympic-style 8-lane track, an alumni building that offers storage facilities and postings of team records, and permanent lights.  Kanley Track was the site of the 1995 Mid-American Conference Track and Field Championships, and continues as the host for a number of Kalamazoo area events and meets.

As of 2006, Western Michigan University only offers women's varsity track and field.  The men's program was discontinued in a 2004 university budget cut.

External links
 WMUBroncos.com page

Western Michigan University
Sports venues in Michigan
Buildings and structures in Kalamazoo, Michigan
Sports in Kalamazoo, Michigan